Tewfik Jallab (born 9 January 1982) is a French actor.

Theater

Filmography

References

External links
 Tewfic Jallab on Allociné
 

People from Argenteuil
21st-century French male actors
20th-century French male actors
French male television actors
French male film actors
French comedians
1982 births
French people of Moroccan descent
Living people